Spatalla parilis, the spike spoon, is a flowering shrub belonging to the genus Spatalla. It forms part of the fynbos. The plant is native to the Western Cape, South Africa.

Description
The plant dies after a fire but the seeds survive. The plant is bisexual and pollinated by insects. Two months after the plant has flowered, the ripe seeds fall to the ground where they are spread by ants.

Distribution and habitat
The plant occurs in the Hottentots Holland Mountains to the Riviersonderend Mountains and on top of the Langeberg at Garcia's Pass.

Gallery

References

External links
Threatened Species Programme | SANBI Red List of South African Plants
Spatalla parilis (Spike spoon)
Uni Spoons
Spatalla parilis Salisb. ex Kn. 1809. bl. 84

parilis
Flora of the Cape Provinces